Fugs 4, Rounders Score is a 1975 compilation album of material by The Fugs and The Holy Modal Rounders, including seven previously unreleased performances from the Fugs' first recording session (April 1965), when the Rounders (Peter Stampfel and Steve Weber) were members of the Fugs' band. The title is both a reference to Abraham Lincoln's Gettysburg Address ("Four score and seven years ago...), and the fact that this is the fourth album of Fugs material released on ESP, as well as a pun on "score" as drug slang. Although all recordings were made under the umbrella of the Fugs, the 6 lead vocals by Stampfel and Weber on Side A allow the album to function as a Rounders compilation as well.  There is a notable and unusual lack of lead vocalizing by Ed Sanders, the most prominent vocalist on all other Fugs albums.

The LP was released on ESP Disc (ESP 2018), probably without the foreknowledge or permission of the musicians.

One of the previously unreleased tracks ("Defeated") was later re-released as a bonus track on the CD version of The Village Fugs.

Track listing
Side one
"Boobs a Lot" (Steve Weber) – 2:13
"Romping Through The Swamp" (Peter Stampfel) – 2:32
"Defeated" (Kupferberg) – 2:30
"Crowley Waltz" (Traditional) – 1:42
"Fiddler a Dram" (Traditional) – 2:32
"Fishing Blues" (Traditional) – 1:56
"New Amphetamine Shriek (Stampfel) – 2:24
"Jackoff Blues" (Kupferberg) – 1:52
Side two
"I Couldn't Get High" (Ken Weaver) – 2:01
"Slum Goddess" (Weaver) – 1:55
"Caca Rocka" (Kupferberg) – 1:30
"CIA Man" (Kupferberg) – 2:48
"Kill for Peace" (Tuli Kupferberg) – 2:07
"Morning, Morning" (Kupferberg) – 2:07
"Virgin Forest Excerpt" (Alderson, Crabtree, Sanders) – 5:23

Tracks 2, 3, 4, 5, 6, 7 and 8 on side A: recorded April 1965, and previously unreleased.
Tracks 1 on side A and track 1, 2 on side B from The Fugs First Album.
Tracks 3 and 4 on side B from Virgin Fugs. (Note: Cover notes notwithstanding, it is an alternate take of A7 that appears on Virgin Fugs.)
Tracks 5, 6, 7, side B From The Fugs.

Tracks 2, 4, 5 and 6 on side A feature only Stampfel and Weber.  Track 1 and 7 on side A feature lead vocals by Weber and/or Stampfel, making them arguably Holy Modal Rounders recordings as well as Fugs recordings.

Personnel

Performance
Ed Sanders – vocals
Tuli Kupferberg – percussion, vocals
Ken Weaver – conga, drums, vocals
Steve Weber – guitar, vocals
Peter Stampfel – fiddle, harmonica, vocals
Vinny Leary  – bass, guitar, vocals
John Anderson – bass guitar, vocals
Lee Crabtree – piano, celeste, bells
Pete Kearney – guitar
Betsy Klein (?) – vocals

Production
Ed Sanders – producer,
Harry Smith – producer
Richard Alderson, Engineer

Additional sources
The Fugs Store: The Fugs First Album

References

The Fugs albums
1975 albums
ESP-Disk albums
Albums produced by Ed Sanders
The Holy Modal Rounders albums
Collaborative albums